Shariful Haque Dalim 
(born 2 February 1946) is a former decorated Bangladesh Liberation War veteran and ambassador of Bangladesh. He was also convicted for his part in the assassination of Sheikh Mujibur Rahman, the country's founding father, in 1975.

Career
Dalim had joined the Pakistan Army. When the Bangladesh Liberation War started he joined the Mukti Bahini. In 1974, he was stationed with the Bengal Lancers. Due to accusation of breach of discipline he lost his commission in 1974.

Assassination of Sheikh Mujibur Rahman

Dalim, along with a few other Bangladesh Army officers including Major Syed Faruque Rahman and Khandaker Abdur Rashid, planned a coup which took place on 15 August 1975. He was asked to lead the attack on the house of President Sheikh Mujib but he refused to do so. He was then given charge of the 2nd Field Artillery Regiment. Assassination of Sheikh Mujib took place during the course of the coup. He took control of Bangladesh Betar  radio station and made an announcement. He said "I am Major Dalim speaking; autocrat Sheikh Mujib has been killed. The army led by Khondaker Mostaq Ahmad has taken over power. Curfew has been declared".

The coup made Mostaq Ahmad the president. The new president declared martial law and passed the 1975 Indemnity Act which provided legal protection to those involved in the coup. He was reinstated in the army and promoted.

From 1 December 1982 to 6 May 1988, Dalim was the Consulate General of Bangladesh in Hong Kong.

Dalim was dismissed from the army. In 1996 the Awami League government, led by Sheikh Hasina began prosecution process for the case. He lives in Pakistan and has a Kenyan passport. He has business interests in Africa. He was sentenced to death in absentia. He currently has an Interpol warrant out on him.

Personal life
Dalim is married to Nimmi Chowdhury. His younger brother is Kamrul Haque Swapan.

References

Living people
1946 births
Recipients of the Bir Uttom
Bangladeshi emigrants to Pakistan
Bangladeshi lieutenant colonels
Kenyan expatriates in Pakistan
Pakistan Army officers
Assassination of Sheikh Mujibur Rahman
People convicted of murder by Bangladesh
Bangladesh Freedom Party politicians
Mukti Bahini personnel